Hollywood Hotel is a 1937 American romantic musical comedy film, directed by Busby Berkeley, starring Dick Powell, Rosemary Lane, Lola Lane, Hugh Herbert, Ted Healy, Glenda Farrell and Johnnie Davis, featuring Alan Mowbray and Mabel Todd, and with Allyn Joslyn, Grant Mitchell and Edgar Kennedy.

The film was based on the popular Hollywood Hotel radio show created by gossip columnist Louella Parsons, where Hollywood stars recreated scenes from their latest movies.  It was broadcast weekly from the hotel of that name.  The film's recreation of the  program features Louella Parsons, Frances Langford, Raymond Paige and His Orchestra, Jerry Cooper, the announcer Ken Niles, Duane Thompson and Benny Goodman and His Orchestra.

Hollywood Hotel, the film, is now best remembered for the featured song and opening number "Hooray for Hollywood" by Johnny Mercer and Richard A. Whiting, sung in the film by Davis and Langford, accompanied by Goodman and his orchestra. The song has become a standard part of the soundtrack to movie award ceremonies, including the Academy Awards. Mercer's lyrics contain numerous references, often satirical, to the movie industry and the path to film stardom.

Plot
Saxophone player and singer Ronnie Bowers, is on his way to Hollywood, having been signed to a ten-week contract by All Star Pictures. At the airport, his former employer, Benny Goodman, and his band give him a big sendoff, performing "Hooray for Hollywood".

In Hollywood, temperamental star Mona Marshall becomes furious when she learns that another actress has landed a part she desperately wanted. As a result, she refuses to attend the premiere of her latest movie. 

Publicist Bernie Walton convinces studio boss B. L. Faulkin to substitute a double. Bernie chooses Virginia Stanton, who has already worked as a stand-in for Mona. For her escort, Bernie chooses an unsuspecting (and starstruck) Ronnie. The charade works. Everyone, from Ronnie to Louella Parsons to the radio host at the premiere is fooled. Things take an unexpected turn when Ronnie and Virginia begin to fall in love, wading in a fountain pond and singing "I'm Like a Fish Out of Water".

The next day, Bernie takes Ronnie to lunch at the restaurant where Virginia is working as a waitress, to break the news of his date's real identity. Ronnie and Virginia begin dating.

When Mona reads in the newspaper that "she" was at the premiere with Ronnie, she forces Faulkin to buy the young man out of his contract. Photographer Fuzzy Boyle appoints himself Ronnie's agent, and they make the rounds, trying to get his acting career started, without success. The two end up employed at a drive-in. When Ronnie sings during work, director Walter Kelton is impressed and offers him a job. Ronnie is disappointed to learn, however, that he will not be acting, but only dubbing the singing for Mona's longtime screen partner, Alex Dupre.

Dupre's "singing" impresses the audience at the preview. When Louella Parsons invites him to perform on her radio program, he accepts without thinking. Desperate, All Star Pictures pays Ronnie an exorbitant fee to sing for the actor. However, Ronnie has his own ideas. Virginia (posing as Mona) picks up Dupre in a limousine driven by Fuzzy. The pair drive him out into the countryside so he misses the program. Ronnie substitutes for Dupre and is a hit, so Faulkin decides to re-sign him, at a larger salary.

Cast

Dick Powell as Ronnie Bowers
Rosemary Lane as Virginia Stanton
Lola Lane as Mona Marshall
Hugh Herbert as Chester Marshall, Mona's father
Ted Healy as Fuzzy Boyle 
Glenda Farrell as Jonesy, Mona's assistant
Johnnie Davis as Georgia
Louella Parsons as herself
Alan Mowbray as Alexander Dupre
Mabel Todd as Dot Marshall, Mona's sister
Frances Langford as Alice Crayne
Jerry Cooper as himself
Ken Niles as himself
Duane Thompson as herself
Allyn Joslyn as Bernie Walton

Grant Mitchell as B. L. Faulkin
Edgar Kennedy as Callaghan, the drive-in owner
Fritz Feld as the Russian, a restaurant patron
Curt Bois as Butch, the dress designer
Perc Westmore as himself
Eddie Acuff as Joe, the cameraman
Clinton Rosemond as Tom, African-American singer
William Davidson as Director Walter Kelton 
Wally Maher as Assistant Director Drew
Georgie Cooper as seamstress
Libby Taylor as Cleo, Mona's maid
Joe Romantini as Waiter
Paul Irving as Bramwell
Raymond Paige and his Orchestra as themselves
Benny Goodman and His Orchestra as themselves

Cast notes:
Louella Parsons, a noted gossip columnist of the time, created the concept of Hollywood Hotel for the radio, and appears in the film as herself.  It was her screen debut.
The Benny Goodman Orchestra at this time included drummer Gene Krupa, Harry James on trumpet, pianist Teddy Wilson and vibraphonist Lionel Hampton.  The strong reaction of the band's fans to its appearance in the film helped to convince Goodman to do the Carnegie Hall concert that had been suggested by his publicist, Wynn Nathanson.  Goodman had been concerned that it would be perceived as a publicity stunt.
Ted Healy is perhaps best known for creating the vaudeville act which later evolved into The Three Stooges. Hollywood Hotel was released in January 1938, less than a month after Healy's death, the cause of which is still a matter of debate today.
Lola Lane, who plays Mona Marshall, and Rosemary Lane, who plays Marshall's stand-in, were sisters.  Another sister, Priscilla Lane, was an even more successful film actress.
Ronald Reagan makes his second film appearance in Hollywood Hotel, uncredited, as the radio host at a film premiere. Reagan would later be well known for his co-starring role in Bedtime for Bonzo.
Both Carole Landis, as a hatcheck girl, and Susan Hayward, as a starlet, appear in the film uncredited.  It was Hayward's film debut.

Production
Warner Bros. originally wanted Bette Davis to play both Mona Marshall and her stand-in, but Davis managed to convince them that it was not a good idea.

The studio was sued by both the Campbell Soup Company, who sponsored the Hollywood Hotel radio program, and by the hotel itself, for using the name without authorization.  The Hollywood Hotel at its peak had attracted the royalty of Hollywood, such as Mary Pickford and Douglas Fairbanks, but it had fallen in prominence by the time this film was made. Some exteriors of the hotel appear in the films. The hotel no longer exists, in its place is the Dolby Theatre, from where the Academy Awards presentations have originated since 2001.

Reception
"Hooray for Hollywood" was nominated for the American Film Institute's 2004 list AFI's 100 Years...100 Songs,
while the movie was nominated for the 2006 list AFI's Greatest Movie Musicals.

See also
 Hollywood Hotel (radio program)
 Ronald Reagan filmography

References
Notes

 Green, Stanley (1999) Hollywood Musicals Year by Year (2nd ed.), pub. Hal Leonard Corporation  page 78

External links
 
 
 
 

1937 films
1937 musical comedy films
1937 romantic comedy films
American romantic comedy films
American black-and-white films
Films based on radio series
Films directed by Busby Berkeley
Films set in Los Angeles
First National Pictures films
Films produced by Samuel Bischoff
Films scored by Ray Heindorf
Films scored by Heinz Roemheld
Warner Bros. films
American romantic musical films
1930s romantic musical films
1930s English-language films
1930s American films